The Specified Subject Condition (SSC) is a condition proposed in Chomsky (1973) which restricts the application of certain syntactic transformational grammar rules. In many ways it is a counterpart to the Tensed-S Condition (TSC) (proposed in the same paper), applying to non-finite clauses and complex determiner phrases (DPs) which are not covered by the TSC. The rule was formalized as follows, where a "specified subject" is a lexical subject i.e. a subject with semantic content, like a proper noun, a complex DP, or a pronominal:

Specified Subject Condition (SSC)
“No rule can involve X, Y in the structure
... X ... [α... Z ... - WYV ...] ...
where Z is the specified subject of WYV in α.”
(Chomsky 1973: 239)

The SSC (along with the TSC) therefore had implications for the field which later became known as binding theory. In conjunction with a simple rule of disjoint reference (which stipulated that any pronoun following a noun phrase (NP) antecedent in the same sentence has disjoint reference with it, the rule applying anywhere unless it is blocked), co-reference is acceptable in the following sentences, because the SSC blocks application of this disjoint reference rule:

(1) The footballersi want [the fans to love themi]
(2) The footballersi laughed at [the fan’s pictures of themi]

The TSC (which essentially blocks transformational and binding rules from applying across clause boundaries) would not block disjoint reference in (1) and (2), hence the need for the SSC. Replacing the pronouns in (1) and (2) with reciprocals shows how the SSC blocks the application of each movement, hence the impossibility of the reciprocals referring back to "The footballers" in (3) and (4):

(3) * The footballersi believe [the supermodel to love each otheri]
(4) * The footballersi laughed at [the supermodel’s pictures of each otheri]

Notice that when the DP-internal subject is removed, each movement is not blocked from applying:

(5) The footballersi laughed at the pictures of each otheri

An empirical problem for the SSC is the failure of disjoint reference to apply in a sentence like (6), where there is no specified subject blocking its application:

(6) The footballersi laughed at the pictures of themi

The SSC also made correct predictions for certain binding data with respect to control verbs. The notion of "specified subject" needs to be nuanced to include PRO with respect to an antecedent which does not control it; however, PRO is not a specified subject with respect to an antecedent which does control it. In the case of an object control verb like "persuade" therefore, we predict the following pattern:

(7) *Wej persuaded Billi [PROi to kill each otherj]
(8) Billj persuaded usi [PROi to kill each otheri]
(9) Wej persuaded Billi [PROi to kill usj]
(10) *Billj persuaded themi [PROi to kill themi]

In (7) PRO is a specified subject with respect to "we" (as it is controlled by "Bill" not by "we"); the SSC therefore applies to this sentence and each movement from "we" to "other" is blocked. Similarly, in (9), PRO is a specified subject for "we", thus blocking disjoint reference, so that "we" can corefer with "us" in the non-finite clause. In (8), PRO is not a specified subject for "us", allowing each movement from "us" to "other"; similarly in (10), disjoint reference between "us" in the matrix clause and "us" in the non-finite clause is not blocked by a specified subject, because "us" in the matrix clause controls PRO.

Similar examples hold for subject control verbs like "persuade": *Theyi promised Billj [PROi to kill themi] vs Billj promised themi [PROj to kill themi], and subject raising verbs like "seem": *Theyi seem to Billj [ti to like themi] (where the trace is not specified with respect to "we" thus disjoint reference applies) vs Wei seem to Billj [ti to like himj] (where the trace is specified with respect to "Bill" so that disjoint reference is blocked).

The way the SSC accounted for binding as well as movement phenomena (such as the each movement examples above), was influential for much subsequent research which tried to reduce binding and movement to the same set of principles (see Kayne (2002) for a recent implementation). The subsequent binding conditions A and B of Chomsky (1981) essentially replaced the SSC (along with the TSC), and it is no longer a part of the toolkit of current researchers.

References

Generative syntax
Syntactic relationships
Syntax